Danville is a city in the administrative region of Estrie, in the Canadian province of Quebec. As of the 2016 Canadian Census, the population was 3,836.

History
Danville is on a stretch of the Chemin Craig, a road built in the 19th century connecting Quebec to New England. American loyalists from New England began arriving in 1783 and gave the town its name in memory of their hometown in Vermont of the same name: Danville, Vermont. The founder of Danville was Simeon Flint, who was a resident from Danville, Vermont.

Until about 1971, the population of Danville was majority Anglophone. However, in the mid-1970s, many of the younger generation migrated to English Canada, Greater Montreal, or New England.

There are many heritage buildings, including three Protestant churches (Christian Adventist, Presbyterian, and United Church of Canada), two Anglican churches, an Evangelical Baptist church and a Roman Catholic church. The Presbyterian church has been retrofitted into a four-star restaurant, and the Christian Advent church has been a private residence since 2007, following its closing in 2006. The Catholic church was erected in 2003, following the 2001 loss by fire of the earlier church erected in 1891. The current United church was completed in 1875 for a Congregational parish and is the oldest church in the town. One of the two Anglican Church of England churches is located on a historic site on the countryside, near the border of the Shipton Township, Denison Mills.

Danville has two primary schools: a French language school, École Masson, and an English-speaking school, known as ADS (Asbestos-Shipton-Danville).

At the centre of the city is a square formed by the enlargement of an intersection. A memorial for soldiers killed in the First World War, the Second World War, and the Korea War is in the centre of the square. Another memorial, to Private Timothy O'Hea, a recipient of the Victoria Cross, is erected in front of the former City Hall.

Once a busy town inhabited by workers of the nearby Johns Manville asbestos mine, the town has quieted down considerably since the mine's closing. A magnesium smelter named Magnola, part of Noranda, using mine tailings from local asbestos mine, was set up in the town for a short time, but it ended up closing due to increasing foreign competition. The bucolic rolling fields in the area are good for farming, with many farms having been around for over a century. Both dairy and beef cattle are raised in the area although other livestock are also common.

Each year, the town has an art symposium in which artists from the area gather in the town's many churches and display their artwork.

Demographics 

Notable people 
Kate Campbell Hurd-Mead - born here. Feminist, suffragist, and obstetrician.
Daniel Johnson, Sr - Premier of Quebec from 1966 until his death in 1968
Mack Sennett - born here. Hollywood filmmaker. First to give a film job to Charlie Chaplin.

References

External links

City of Danville official site. 
Danville-Shipton Historical Society 
Townships Heritage: Danville Walking Tour.  
 Danville-Shipton Chamber of Commerce 
International Arts Symposium of Danville 

Cities and towns in Quebec
Incorporated places in Estrie